Exbury (1959–1979) was a French Thoroughbred racehorse named for the famous Exbury Gardens Estate in Hampshire, England belonging to owner Guy de Rothschild's cousin, Edmund de Rothschild.

Background
Bred at the Rothschild's Haras de Meautry in Touques, Calvados, through his sire's line Exbury is a descendant of Haras de Meautry's great champion Brantôme and on his mare's side, the extremely important Italian sire, Nearco. Trained at Chantilly by the Englishman, Geoffroy Watson, a son of trainer John Watson who for forty years was the private trainer for the successful racing stable of Leopold de Rothschild.

Racing career
At age two, Exbury started four times, winning once and finishing second three times. As a three-year-old, in a year where Val de Loir and Match II were prominent, Exbury began to show some of his ability, winning two conditions races and finishing second to Match II in the important Grand Prix de Saint-Cloud.

At age four Exbury came into his own, winning all five of his 1963 starts, beating many of the best in France and in England. The National Horseracing Museum called Exbury "the best middle distance horse in Europe in 1963." That year, Exbury won the Prix Boïard, then beat Val de Loir by four lengths in winning the Prix Ganay. In England he won the Coronation Cup by six lengths then back in France beat Val de Loir again in the Grand Prix de Saint-Cloud and capped off the year with a victory in France's most prestigious horse race, the Prix de l'Arc de Triomphe. 
Including Exbury, horses owned by Guy de Rothschild won the Prix Boiard at Hippodrome de Saint-Cloud six times. In 1969, France Galop renamed the race in Exbury's honor.

Stud record
Exbury was retired to Haras de Meautry stud in Calvados, France at the end of the 1963 campaign.

He enjoyed reasonable success as a sire, producing several stakes/conditions race winners. Most prominent among them was Crow whose victories include the St. Leger Stakes, Coronation Cup (both G1) and the Prix Eugène Adam. His German-bred son Ataxerxes won the Preis von Europa (G1). Another Exbury son, Madison Palace, won conditions/stakes races in France and California and the Exbury filly Example won conditions races in France and England.

His son, Zamazaan, was exported to New Zealand where he sired 58 stakeswinners for 123 stakeswins.

Another son, Calshot Light (GB) was exported to Australia where sired 23 live foals, but no stakeswinners.

References

 The United Kingdom's National Horseracing Museum reference to Exbury
 Prix Exbury with profile of Exbury at France Galop (French language)

1959 racehorse births
1979 racehorse deaths
Racehorses bred in Calvados (department)
Racehorses trained in France
Arc winners

Thoroughbred family 2-f